Haverhill is a town in Palm Beach County, Florida, United States. Haverhill became a town on May 3, 1950, and was named after the city of Haverhill, Massachusetts. The town has maintained a small population since its establishment. The 2010 census recorded a population of 1,873, while the population was estimated at 2,123 in 2018. Haverhill, located in east-central Palm Beach County near the western periphery of the Palm Beach International Airport, is also small geographically, encompassing just .

History

In 1949, approximately 50 families living in the area began an effort to incorporate it into a town. A share of the first settlers being natives of Haverhill, Massachusetts, caused the name to be selected. A vote on the motion to incorporate occurred on May 3, 1950. A total 59 out of 65 registered voters in Haverhill attended, who voted 42–17 in favor of incorporation. Ray Cox became the first mayor; other officers included Mrs. Fred Raulerson as town clerk, Tom Steele as town marshal, and Don Boyd, Henry Franklin, Paul Huffman, Myron V. Kelly, and A. J. Ward as town council members. The first census of the town, taken in 1960, recorded a population of 442. In the mid 1960s, construction began on a town hall, completed in August 1967 at a cost of $25,000. The town hall is a one-story building located at 4585 Charlotte Street near the eastern edge of the town. The town council is composed of five seats including the vice mayor and mayor. The current mayor is Jay Foy.

Geography

Haverhill is located at  (26.690310, –80.120913). Although surrounded by unincorporated areas, Haverhill is located just west-northwest of the Palm Beach International Airport and borders the census-designated places of Lake Belvedere Estates, Royal Palm Estates, and Stacy Street.

The Town of Haverhill includes Haverhill Park, a county park located on 5470 Belvedere Road. The town hall is also adjacent to, and operates the Tommy Plyler Baseball Field (little league)

Demographics

2020 census

As of the 2020 United States census, there were 2,187 people, 652 households, and 531 families residing in the town.

2000 census
As of the census of 2000, there were 1,454 people, 537 households, and 392 families residing in the town. The racial makeup of the town was 78.95% White (of which 64.9% were Non-Hispanic White,) 12.38% African American, 0.21% Native American, 1.24% Asian, 0.21% Pacific Islander, 4.68% from other races, and 2.34% from two or more races. Hispanic or Latino of any race were 20.70% of the population.

There were 537 households, out of which 38.2% had children under the age of 18 living with them, 56.1% were married couples living together, 11.5% had a female householder with no husband present, and 27.0% were non-families. 19.6% of all households were made up of individuals, and 4.3% had someone living alone who was 65 years of age or older.  The average household size was 2.71 and the average family size was 3.12.

In the town, the population was spread out, with 26.3% under the age of 18, 6.7% from 18 to 24, 32.1% from 25 to 44, 24.8% from 45 to 64, and 10.2% who were 65 years of age or older.  The median age was 37 years. For every 100 females, there were 101.4 males.  For every 100 females age 18 and over, there were 99.3 males.

The median income for a household in the town was $50,652, and the median income for a family was $53,167. Males had a median income of $31,100 versus $28,375 for females. The per capita income for the town was $24,503.  About 6.3% of families and 8.3% of the population were below the poverty line, including 8.9% of those under age 18 and 7.0% of those age 65 or over.

As of 2000, speakers of English as a first language accounted for 77.93% of all residents, while Spanish as a mother tongue made up 22.06% of the population.

As of 2000, Haverhill had the fifty-eighth highest percentage of Cuban residents in the US, with 6.63% of the populace. It also had the forty-second highest percentage of Jamaican residents in the US, at 3.10% of the town's population.

See also

 Golfview, Florida – a former town located just east of Haverhill 
 Mounts Botanical Garden – a botanical garden located just outside the town's boundaries

References

External links
 Town of Haverhill

Towns in Palm Beach County, Florida
Towns in Florida